Mount Perry is an unincorporated community in northern Madison Township, Perry County, Ohio, United States, northeast of Somerset. State Route 204 runs through the town.  It is in the Northern Local School District, home of the Sheridan Generals.

Mount Perry was laid out in 1828. A post office called Mount Perry has been in operation since 1843.

References

Unincorporated communities in Perry County, Ohio
1828 establishments in Ohio